Wild haggis (given the humorous taxonomic designation Haggis scoticus) is a fictional creature of Scottish folklore, said to be native to the Scottish Highlands. It is comically claimed to be the source of haggis, a traditional Scottish dish that is in fact made from the innards of sheep (including heart, lungs, and liver).

According to some sources, the wild haggis's left and right legs are of different lengths (cf. Sidehill gouger or Dahu), allowing it to run quickly around the steep mountains and hillsides which make up its natural habitat, but only in one direction. It is further claimed that there are two varieties of haggis, one with longer left legs and the other with longer right legs. The former variety can run clockwise around a mountain (as seen from above) while the latter can run  anticlockwise. The two varieties coexist peacefully but are unable to interbreed in the wild because in order for the male of one variety to mate with a female of the other, he must turn to face in the same direction as his intended mate, causing him to lose his balance before he can mount her. As a result of this difficulty, differences in leg length among the haggis population are accentuated.

Haggis abroad
The notion of the wild haggis is widely believed, though not always including the idea of mismatched legs. According to an online survey commissioned by haggis manufacturers Hall's of Broxburn, released on 26 November 2003, one-third of U.S. visitors to Scotland believed the wild haggis to be a real creature.

See also

Sidehill gouger
Dahu, another fictional animal also said to exist in "clockwise" and "anticlockwise" varieties
Jackalope
Wolpertinger
Drop bear
Tree octopus

References

Scottish folklore
Haggis
Fictional animals
Scottish legendary creatures